Ivan Rajčić (born 16 April 1981) is a Croatian retired footballer.

Career
On 13 July 2011 Rajčić was signed by Benevento in a 2-year deal.

In 2013 Rajčić was suspended for  years for his involvement in a match-fixing scandal. It was reduced by Tribunale Nazionale di Arbitrato per lo Sport to 13 months in April 2014.

In 2014, he was signed by Casertana. On 26 January 2016 Rajčić was signed by Martina in a -year deal.

References

External links
 
 
 Profile at HNS 
 AIC profile 
 

1981 births
Living people
Footballers from Split, Croatia
Association football midfielders
Croatian footballers
Croatia youth international footballers
Hellas Verona F.C. players
S.S. Chieti Calcio players
S.S.C. Bari players
Frosinone Calcio players
Taranto F.C. 1927 players
A.S.D. Barletta 1922 players
Benevento Calcio players
Casertana F.C. players
Serie C players
Serie B players
Croatian expatriate footballers
Expatriate footballers in Italy
Croatian expatriate sportspeople in Italy